Niagara Falls is a federal electoral district in Ontario, Canada, that has been represented in the House of Commons of Canada since 1953.

It consists of the city of Niagara Falls and the towns of Niagara-on-the-Lake and Fort Erie.

History

The riding was created in 1952 from parts of Erie—Lincoln and Welland ridings. It consisted initially of the townships of Stamford, Willoughby and Bertie, the city of Niagara Falls, and the towns of Fort Erie, Chippawa and Crystal Beach in the county of Welland. In 1966, the towns of Fort Erie, Chippawa and Crystal Beach and the township of Stamford were excluded from the riding.

In 1976, the riding was redefined to consist of the City of Niagara Falls and the Town of Niagara-on-the-Lake. In 1996, the riding was expanded to include the part of the City of Thorold lying east of the Welland Canal. In 2004 the western boundary of the riding was moved east from the Welland Canal to the Thorold town line, while the southern boundary was extended south to Lake Erie. This change excluded the town of Thorold and included all of the town of Fort Erie.

This riding was left unchanged during the 2012 electoral redistribution.

Demographics
According to the Canada 2021 Census

Ethnic groups: 79.2% White, 4.6% South Asian, 3.9% Indigenous, 2.6% Black, 2.2% Chinese, 2.3% Filipino, 1.6% Latin American
Languages: 77.7% English, 2.6% Italian, 1.6% French, 1.4% Spanish, 1.1% Tagalog, 1.1% German, 1.0% Mandarin
Religions: 60.9% Christian (30.6% Catholic, 5.8% Anglican, 4.0% United Church, 2.0% Presbyterian, 2.0% Christian Orthodox, 1.5% Lutheran, 1.1% Baptist, 1.0% Pentecostal, 1.0% Anabaptist, 11.9% Other), 2.9% Muslim, 1.5% Hindu, 32.2% None. 
Median income: $36,800 (2020)
Average income: $47,720 (2020)

Federal riding associations

Riding associations are the local branches of the national political parties:

Members of Parliament

This riding has elected the following Members of Parliament:

Election results

 					

Note: Conservative vote is compared to the total of the Canadian Alliance vote and Progressive Conservative vote in 2000 election.

Note: Canadian Alliance vote is compared to the Reform vote in 1997 election.
					

				

	

			

				

	

					

Note: NDP vote is compared to CCF vote in 1958 election.

See also
 List of Canadian federal electoral districts
 Past Canadian electoral districts

References

Notes

External links
Riding history from the Library of Parliament
 2011 results from Elections Canada
 Campaign expense data from Elections Canada
 Niagara Falls Liberal Website

Fort Erie, Ontario
Niagara-on-the-Lake
Ontario federal electoral districts
Politics of Niagara Falls, Ontario
1952 establishments in Ontario